The 2021 Rio Tennis Classic was a professional tennis tournament played on hard courts. It was the second edition of the tournament which was part of the 2021 ATP Challenger Tour. It took place in Rio de Janeiro, Brazil from 13 to 19 December 2021.

Singles main-draw entrants

Seeds

 1 Rankings are as of 6 December 2021.

Other entrants
The following players received wildcards into the singles main draw:
  Gabriel Décamps
  Lorenzo Esquici
  Wilson Leite

The following player received entry into the singles main draw using a protected ranking:
  Guilherme Clezar

The following player received entry into the singles main draw as a special exempt:
  Igor Marcondes

The following player received entry into the singles main draw as an alternate:
  Mateus Alves

The following players received entry from the qualifying draw:
  Nicolás Barrientos
  Luca Castelnuovo
  Rafael Matos
  José Pereira

The following players received entry as lucky losers:
  Roy Smith
  Federico Zeballos

Champions

Singles

  Kaichi Uchida def.  Nicolás Álvarez Varona 3–6, 6–3, 7–6(7–3).

Doubles

  Orlando Luz /  Rafael Matos def.  James Cerretani /  Fernando Romboli 6–3, 7–6(7–2).

References

2021 ATP Challenger Tour
2021
2021 in Brazilian sport
December 2021 sports events in South America